"Amylobacillus"  is a genus of bacteria from the family of Bacillaceae with one known species (Amylobacillus thermophilus).

References

Bacillaceae
Bacteria genera
Monotypic bacteria genera